Mutanda may refer to:
 Mutanda, Zambia, a town in Solwezi District, north-western Zambia
 Lake Mutanda, a small freshwater lake in Uganda.
 Mutanda Mine, an open-pit copper mine in the Katanga Province of the Democratic Republic of the Congo